Do Shakh may refer to:
 Do Shakh, Afghanistan
 Do Shakh, Iran